Baron Heinrich Karl von Haymerle (7 December 1828 – 10 October 1881) was an Austrian statesman born and educated in Vienna. He took part in the students' uprising in the revolution of 1848 and narrowly escaped execution.  He served in the diplomatic corps at Athens, Dresden, and Frankfurt as Secretary of Legation; and served as ambassador in Copenhagen (1864), took part in negotiating the Treaty of Prague (1866), and from Berlin went to Constantinople (1868), Athens (1869), The Hague (1872), and in 1877 to the Italian court. He represented Austria-Hungary at the Congress of Berlin in 1878 and served as foreign minister from 1879 to 1881.  In this post he was especially active in effecting friendly relations with Italy and cementing the alliance with Germany.

Publications 
 Alfred Ritter von Arneth, Heinrich Freiherr von Haymerle (Berlin, 1882)

1828 births
1881 deaths
19th-century Austrian people
Foreign ministers of Austria-Hungary
Austrian diplomats
Barons of Austria
Bohemian nobility
Austrian people of German Bohemian descent
Politicians from Vienna